Doug Trapp (born November 28, 1965 in Balcarres, Saskatchewan) is a former professional ice hockey left wing.  He was drafted in the second round, 39th overall, by the Buffalo Sabres in the 1984 NHL Entry Draft.  He played two games in the National Hockey League with Buffalo in the 1986–87 season, going scoreless.

Personal life
Trapp's father Barry and both of Trapp's sons are involved with hockey. Barry began coaching the Regina Pat Blues in the 1980s and as of 2014, is involved with the Toronto Maple Leafs scouting team and Canadian National Junior team. His son Bear played collegiate hockey for the Sacred Heart Pioneers and his youngest son Spencer played for College of the Holy Cross.

Career statistics

Regular season and playoffs

Awards
 WHL East Second All-Star Team – 1984

References

External links
 

1965 births
Living people
Buffalo Sabres draft picks
Buffalo Sabres players
Canadian expatriate ice hockey players in the United States
Canadian ice hockey left wingers
Ice hockey people from Saskatchewan
Regina Blues players
Regina Pats players
Rochester Americans players